The Armed Aerial Scout (AAS) was the planned replacement for the OH-58 Kiowa in United States Army service.

History
The Armed Aerial Scout program replaced the previous Armed Reconnaissance Helicopter program, which chose the Bell ARH-70 Arapaho that was canceled due to cost overruns. An Analysis of Alternatives was conducted and a Request for Proposals was planned to be issued in 2014. The U.S. Army had until December 2012 to decide whether to proceed with the program. On 29 November 2012, Army officials decided to proceed with the Armed Aerial Scout program to acquire a new scout helicopter. On 8 January 2013, the Army began redrafting the presentation for the service's vice chief of staff before they move ahead with a competition. Vice Chief of Staff General Lloyd Austin III requested more data from the voluntary flight demonstrations done on helicopter entries, as well as taking into account the pace of other technologies, such as unmanned capabilities and future sensors. The Army concluded that its decision for the AAS program would result in either a new development effort or a service life-extension program (SLEP) for the OH-58F Kiowa.

Evaluations of commercial off-the-shelf designs were made from voluntary flight demonstrations in 2012. The five candidates included the OH-58F Block II, AH-6i, AAS-72X/X+, MD 540F, and AW139M (used for demonstration, with AW169 AAS offered as candidate). The Sikorsky S-97 Raider was offered, but no prototype was available for demonstration. Army evaluations concluded that no current aircraft met requirements. A decision on the Armed Aerial Scout program was expected "in late summer or early fall" 2013. Boeing had attempted to stop MD Helicopters from offering its MD 540F in the program, as it shared the same airframe design as Boeing's AH-6. In July 2013, MD Helicopters was allowed to continue to promote its offering in the program.

In October 2013, the Army said that the AAS program was at risk of being delayed or canceled due to sequestration cuts. The Armed Aerial Scout program ended in late 2013 with no alternative scout helicopter being selected for procurement. In 2012, Army leaders had thought a new aircraft was the best option. After sequestration in early 2013, the expected $16 billion cost of a new armed scout helicopter fleet was concluded to be too much. The Army then moved on with considerations for scrapping the entire OH-58 Kiowa fleet and moving more AH-64E Apache Guardian attack helicopters to the active Army for use in the scouting role. Even if the competition is not reopened, the Army will develop a new scout helicopter as part of the Future Vertical Lift program.

Contenders

Contenders have included:
AAS-72X
In October 2010 a consortium of EADS North America, American Eurocopter and Lockheed Martin announced that it was preparing to fly the first of three AAS-72X prototypes. The design is in the same family as the Eurocopter UH-72 Lakota.

Bell OH-58F Block II
Upgrade of the current Kiowa Warrior.

Boeing AH-6S
Improved version of the MH-6 Little Bird

AgustaWestland AW109
Multipurpose light helicopter

Sikorsky S-97 Raider
In May 2009, Sikorsky unveiled a mock-up of its X2-based contender later given the company's S-97 designation.

OH-58D/AVX
Proposed by the AVX Aircraft Company is a modification of the current OH-58D design to meet the AAS requirement. The design uses the basic Kiowa fuselage and adds a counter-rotating coaxial rotor and two ducted fans.

Contenders by 2012
Candidate helicopters for interim replacement were to conduct flight demonstrations in spring 2012.

The contenders as of June 2012 were:
AgustaWestland AW139M - changed to AgustaWestland AW169 AAS
Boeing AH-6
EADS AAS-72X and AAS-72X+
Bell OH-58F Block II
Sikorsky S-97 Raider
MD Helicopters MD 540F

References

External links
Armed Aerial Scout Helicopter Request for Information. fbo.gov, 26 January 2010.
Sources Sought for Armed Reconnaissance Helicopter (ARH). fbo.gov, 7 November 2008.
Armed Aerial Scout (AAS) Analysis of Alternatives (AoA) paper. U.S. Army, 22 March 2010.
"ARH Program" . Rotor & Wing magazine, 1 June 2009.
New Attitudes about UAVs Shape Army’s Scout Helicopter Program. NDIA, April 2010
"U.S. Army ARH Program Undergoes Major Shift" Aviation Week, 24 April 2009.
Armed Aerial Scout 72X Airbus Helicopters proposal for the AAS.
Kiowa Warrior Block II Bell Helicopter's proposal for the Armed Scout.

Military aircraft procurement programs of the United States